Dary Batista de Oliveira (born 20 October 1940) is a Brazilian former footballer who competed in the 1960 Summer Olympics.

References

1940 births
Living people
Association football defenders
Brazilian footballers
Olympic footballers of Brazil
Footballers at the 1960 Summer Olympics
Fluminense FC players
Pan American Games medalists in football
Pan American Games silver medalists for Brazil
Footballers at the 1959 Pan American Games
Medalists at the 1959 Pan American Games